WETU-LD, virtual channel 39 (UHF digital channel 21), is a Low-power Daystar owned-and-operated television station licensed to Montgomery, Alabama, United States. The station is owned by the Bedford, Texas-based Daystar Television Network. Prior to being purchased by Daystar, the station was co-owned with WAXC-LD and for many years carried the same programming including a UPN affiliation during the 1990s.

References

External links

Daystar (TV network) affiliates
Low-power television stations in the United States
ETU-LD
Television channels and stations established in 1988
1988 establishments in Alabama